This is a list of nominated candidates for the Conservative Party of Canada in the 40th Canadian federal election. The party nominated 307 out of a possible 308 candidates, Portneuf—Jacques-Cartier was the only riding not to field a Conservative candidate.

Newfoundland and Labrador - 7 seats

Prince Edward Island - 4 seats

Nova Scotia - 11 seats

Cape Breton—Canso
Allan R. Murphy

Central Nova
Peter MacKay, incumbent MP and Minister of National Defence

Cumberland—Colchester—Musquodoboit Valley
Joel Bernard

Dartmouth—Cole Harbour
Wanda Webber

Halifax
Ted Larsen

Halifax West
Rakesh Khosla

Kings—Hants
Rosemary Segado

Sackville—Eastern Shore
David K. Montgomery

South Shore—St. Margaret's
Gerald Keddy, incumbent MP

Sydney—Victoria
Kristen Rudderham

West Nova
Greg Kerr

New Brunswick - 10 seats

Acadie—Bathurst
Jean-Guy Dubé

Beauséjour
Omer Léger, former provincial cabinet minister under Richard Hatfield

Fredericton
Keith Ashfield, former provincial cabinet minister under Bernard Lord

Fundy Royal
Rob Moore - Incumbent MP

Madawaska—Restigouche
Jean-Pierre Ouellet former provincial cabinet minister under Richard Hatfield

Miramichi
Tilly Gordon

Moncton—Riverview—Dieppe
Daniel Allain, CEO of Downtown Moncton Centre-Ville.

New Brunswick Southwest
Greg Thompson - Incumbent MP and Minister of Veteran Affairs

Saint John
Rodney Weston, former provincial cabinet minister under Bernard Lord

Tobique—Mactaquac
Mike Allen - Incumbent MP

Quebec - 75 seats

Abitibi—Baie-James—Nunavik—Eeyou
Jean-Maurice Matte
Abitibi

Abitibi—Témiscamingue
Pierre Grandmaitre

Ahuntsic
Jean Précourt

Alfred-Pellan
Alexandre Salameh

Argenteuil—Papineau—Mirabel
Scott Pearce

Beauce
Maxime Bernier, incumbent MP.

Beauharnois—Salaberry
Dominique Bellemare

Beauport—Limoilou
Sylvie Boucher

Berthier—Maskinongé
Marie-Claude Godue

Bourassa
Michelle Allaire

Brossard—La Prairie
Maurice Brossard

Chambly—Borduas
Suzanne Chartand

Charlesbourg—Haute-Saint-Charles
Daniel Petit, incumbent MP.

Châteauguay—Saint-Constant
Pierre-Paul Routhier

Chicoutimi—Le Fjord
Jean-Guy Maltais

Compton—Stanstead
Michel Gagné

Drummond
André Komlosy

Gaspésie—Îles-de-la-Madeleine
Darryl Gray

Gatineau
Denis Tassé

Haute-Gaspésie—La Mitis—Matane—Matapédia
Jérôme Landry

Hochelaga
Luc Labbé

Honoré-Mercier
Rodrigo Alfaro

Hull—Aylmer
Paul Fréchette

Jeanne-Le Ber

Joliette
Sylvie Lavallée

Jonquière—Alma
Jean-Pierre Blackburn, incumbent MP and Minister of Labour

La Pointe-de-l'Île
Hubert Pichet

Lac-Saint-Louis
Andrea Paine

LaSalle—Émard
Béatrice Guay-Pepper

Laurentides—Labelle
Guy Joncas

Laurier—Sainte-Marie

Laval
Jean-Pierre Bélisle

Laval—Les Îles
Agop Evereklian

Lévis—Bellechasse
Steven Blaney

Longueuil—Pierre-Boucher
Jacques Bouchard

Lotbinière—Chutes-de-la-Chaudière
Jacques Gourde

Louis-Hébert
Luc Harvey

Louis-Saint-Laurent
Josée Verner

Manicouagan
Pierre Breton

Marc-Aurèle-Fortin
Claude Moreau

Mégantic—L'Érable
Christian Paradis

Montcalm
Claude Marc Boudreau

Montmagny—L'Islet—Kamouraska—Rivière-du-Loup
Denis Laflamme

Montmorency—Charlevoix—Haute-Côte-Nord
Guy-Léonard Tremblay

Mount Royal
Rafael Tzoubari

Notre-Dame-de-Grâce—Lachine
Carmine Pontillo

Papineau
Mustague Sarker

Pierrefonds—Dollard
Pierre-Olivier Brunelle

Pontiac
Lawrence Cannon, incumbent MP.

Portneuf-Jacques-Cartier
No Candidate

Québec
Myriam Taschereau

Repentigny
Bruno Royer

Richmond—Arthabaska
Éric Lefebvre

Rimouski-Neigette—Témiscouata—Les Basques
Gaston Noël

Rivière-des-Mille-Îles
Claude Carignan

Rivière-du-Nord
Gilles Duguay

Roberval—Lac-Saint-Jean
Denis Lebel

Rosemont—La Petite-Patrie
Sylvie Boulianne

Saint-Bruno—Saint-Hubert
Nicole Charbonneau Barron

Saint-Hyacinthe—Bagot
René Vincelette

Saint-Jean
Marie-Josée Mercier

Saint-Lambert
Patrick Clune

Saint-Laurent—Cartierville
Dennis Galiatsatos

Saint-Léonard—Saint-Michel
Lucie Le Tourneau

Saint-Maurice—Champlain
Stéphane Roof

Sherbrooke
André Bachand

Terrebonne—Blainville
Daniel Lebel

Trois-Rivières
Claude Durand

Vaudreuil—Soulanges
Michael Fortier, Minister of Public Works

Verchères—Les Patriotes
Benoît Dussault

Westmount—Ville-Marie
Guy Dufort

Ontario - 106 seats

Ajax—Pickering
Rick Johnson

Algoma—Manitoulin—Kapuskasing
Dianne Musgrove

Ancaster—Dundas—Flamborough—Westdale
David Sweet

Barrie
Patrick Brown

Beaches—East York
Caroline Alleslev

Bramalea—Gore—Malton
Stella Ambler

Brampton—Springdale
Parm Gill

Brampton West
Kyle Seeback

Brant
Phil McColeman

Bruce—Grey—Owen Sound
Larry Miller

Burlington
Mike Wallace

Cambridge
Gary Goodyear

Carleton—Mississippi Mills
Gordon O'Connor, incumbent MP and Minister of National Revenue.

Chatham-Kent—Essex
Dave Van Kesteren

Davenport
Theresa Rodriguez

Don Valley East
Eugene McDermott

Don Valley West
John Carmichael

Dufferin—Caledon
David Tilson

Durham
Bev Oda, incumbent MP.

Eglinton—Lawrence
Joe Oliver

Elgin—Middlesex—London
Joe Preston

Essex
Jeff Watson

Etobicoke Centre
Axel Kuhn

Etobicoke—Lakeshore
Patrick Boyer

Etobicoke North
Bob Saroya

Glengarry—Prescott—Russell
Pierre Lemieux

Guelph
Gloria Kovach

Haldimand—Norfolk
Diane Finley, incumbent MP and Minister of Citizenship and Immigration.

Haliburton—Kawartha Lakes—Brock
Barry Devolin

Halton
Lisa Raitt is the president and chief executive officer of the Toronto Port Authority (TPA), a Canadian federal corporation that manages commerce, transportation (including the Toronto City Centre Airport) and recreation in the Toronto harbour. She has also served as the TPA's corporate secretary and general counsel, and harbourmaster. She is believed to have been the first female harbourmaster of a Canadian port. She is currently on unpaid leave from the TPA for the duration of the election.  Lisa Raitt's OFFICIAL Campaign Website  Lisa Raitt's Campaign Blog

Hamilton Centre
Leon O'Connor

Hamilton East—Stoney Creek
Frank Rukavina

Hamilton Mountain
Terry Anderson

Huron—Bruce
Ben Lobb

Kenora
Greg Rickford

Kingston and the Islands
Brian Abrams

Kitchener Centre
Stephen Bonner

Kitchener—Conestoga
Harold Albrecht

Kitchener—Waterloo
Peter Braid

Lambton—Kent—Middlesex
Bev Shipley

Lanark—Frontenac—Lennox and Addington
Scott Reid

Leeds—Grenville
Gord Brown

London—Fanshawe
Mary Lou Ambrogio

London North Centre
Paul Van Meerbergen

London West
Ed Holder

Markham—Unionville
Duncan Fletcher

Mississauga—Brampton South
Salma Ataullahjan is a current Canadian Senator appointed on July 9, 2010.

Mississauga East—Cooksville
Melissa Bhagat

Mississauga—Erindale
Bob Dechert

Mississauga South
Hugh Arrison

Mississauga—Streetsville
Wajid Khan, incumbent MP.

Nepean—Carleton
Pierre Poilievre

Newmarket—Aurora
Lois Brown

Niagara Falls
Rob Nicholson, incumbent MP and Minister of Justice.

Niagara West—Glanbrook
Dean Allison, incumbent MP.

Nickel Belt
Ian McCracken

Nipissing—Timiskaming
Joe Sinicrope

Northumberland—Quinte West
Rick Norlock

Oak Ridges—Markham
Paul Calandra

Oakville
Terence Young

Oshawa
Colin Carrie

Ottawa Centre
Brian McGarry

Ottawa—Orléans
Royal Galipeau

Ottawa South
Elie Salibi

Ottawa—Vanier

Patrick Glémaud

Ottawa West—Nepean
John Baird, incumbent MP and Minister of the Environment.

Oxford
Dave MacKenzie

Parkdale—High Park
Jilian Saweczko

Parry Sound—Muskoka
Tony Clement, incumbent MP and Minister of Health.

Perth—Wellington
Gary Schellenberger, incumbent MP

Peterborough
Dean Del Mastro, incumbent MP

Pickering—Scarborough East
George Khouri

Prince Edward—Hastings
Daryl Kramp, incumbent MP

Renfrew—Nipissing—Pembroke
Cheryl Gallant, incumbent MP.

Richmond Hill
Chungsen Leung

St. Catharines
Rick Dykstra, incumbent MP

St. Paul's
Heather Jewell

Sarnia—Lambton
Pat Davidson, incumbent MP

Sault Ste. Marie
Cameron Ross

Scarborough—Agincourt
Benson Lau

Scarborough Centre
Roxanne James

Scarborough—Guildwood
Chuck Konkel

Scarborough—Rouge River
Jerry Bance

Scarborough Southwest
Greg Crompton

Simcoe—Grey
Helena Guergis, incumbent MP

Simcoe North
Bruce Stanton, incumbent MP

Stormont—Dundas—South Glengarry
Guy Lauzon

Sudbury: Gerry Labelle
Gerry Labelle was born in Mattawa and raised in Sudbury. He is a businessperson and community activist in Sudbury, where he operates a consulting firm. Labelle is a founding member of Music and Film in Motion and has served on the board of several non-profit organizations. At the time of the election, he was a member of the Make Poverty History committee on the city's Social Planning Council.

Labelle became involved in a minor controversy during the 2008 campaign when he made statements in a French-language interview that seemed critical of the Conservative government. According to a press release from Liberal incumbent Diane Marleau, Labelle criticized Finance Minister Jim Flaherty for describing Ontario as "the last place" to invest, took issue with the government's decision to abolish the Court Challenges Program of Canada, and said that he was not impressed with the Conservative Party's environmental record. He later issued a retraction, saying that he had not expressed himself clearly and was fully supportive of the Harper government. Labelle also spoke in support of the arts community and rejected arguments that his party was hostile to the arts. Late in the campaign, the Sudbury Star newspaper noted that he "did not come across as a Harper Conservative".

Labelle received 11,073 votes (25.79%), finishing third against New Democratic Party candidate Glenn Thibeault. He has said that he will probably run for Conservatives again.

Thornhill
Peter Kent

Thunder Bay—Rainy River
Richard Neumann

Thunder Bay—Superior North
Bev Sarafin

Timmins—James Bay
Bill Greenberg

Toronto Centre
David Gentili

Toronto—Danforth
Christina Perreault

Trinity—Spadina
Christine McGirr

Vaughan
Richard Lorello

Welland
Alf Kiers

Wellington—Halton Hills
Michael Chong, incumbent MP.

Whitby—Oshawa
Jim Flaherty, incumbent MP and Minister of Finance.

Willowdale
Jake Karns

Windsor—Tecumseh
Denise Ghanam

Windsor West
Lisa Lumley

York Centre
Rochelle Wilner

York—Simcoe
Peter Van Loan, incumbent MP.

York South—Weston
Aydin Cocelli

York West
Kevin Nguyen

Manitoba - 14 seats

Brandon—Souris
Merv Tweed, incumbent MP.

Charleswood—St. James—Assiniboia
Steven Fletcher, incumbent MP.

Churchill
Wally Daudrich

Dauphin—Swan River—Marquette
Inky Mark, incumbent MP.

Elmwood—Transcona
Thomas Steen

Kildonan—St. Paul
Joy Smith, incumbent MP.

Portage—Lisgar
Candice Hoeppner

Provencher
Vic Toews, incumbent MP.

Saint Boniface
Shelly Glover

Selkirk—Interlake
James Bezan, incumbent MP.

Winnipeg Centre
Kenny Daodu

Winnipeg North
Ray Larkin

Winnipeg South
Rod Bruinooge, incumbent MP.

Winnipeg South Centre
Trevor Kennerd

Saskatchewan - 14 seats

Battlefords—Lloydminster
Gerry Ritz, incumbent MP and Minister of Agriculture.

Blackstrap
Lynne Yelich, incumbent MP.

Cypress Hills—Grasslands
David L. Anderson, incumbent MP.

Desnethé—Missinippi—Churchill River
Rob Clarke, incumbent MP.

Palliser

Ray Boughen

Prince Albert
Randy Hoback

Regina—Lumsden—Lake Centre
Tom Lukiwski, incumbent MP.

Regina—Qu'Appelle
Andrew Scheer, incumbent MP.

Saskatoon—Humboldt
Brad Trost, incumbent MP.

Saskatoon—Rosetown—Biggar
Kelly Block

Saskatoon—Wanuskewin
Maurice Vellacott, incumbent MP.

Souris—Moose Mountain
Ed Komarnicki, incumbent MP.

Wascana
Michelle Hunter

Yorkton—Melville
Garry Breitkreuz, incumbent MP.

Alberta - 28 seats

Calgary Centre
Lee Richardson, incumbent MP.

Calgary Centre-North
Jim Prentice, incumbent MP.

Calgary East
Deepak Obhrai, incumbent MP.

Calgary Northeast
Devinder Shory

Calgary—Nose Hill
Diane Ablonczy, incumbent MP.

Calgary Southeast
Jason Kenney, incumbent MP.

Calgary Southwest
Stephen Harper, incumbent MP and Prime Minister of Canada.

Calgary West
Rob Anders, incumbent MP.

Crowfoot
Kevin Sorenson, incumbent MP.

Edmonton Centre
Laurie Hawn, incumbent MP.

Edmonton East
Peter Goldring, incumbent MP.

Edmonton—Leduc
James Rajotte, incumbent MP.

Edmonton—Mill Woods—Beaumont
Mike Lake, incumbent MP.

Edmonton—St. Albert
Brent Rathgeber, former MLA for Edmonton-Calder.

Edmonton—Sherwood Park
Tim Uppal

Edmonton—Spruce Grove
Rona Ambrose, incumbent MP.

Edmonton—Strathcona
Rahim Jaffer, incumbent MP.

Fort McMurray—Athabasca
Brian Jean, incumbent MP.

Lethbridge
Rick Casson, incumbent MP.

Macleod
Ted Menzies, incumbent MP.

Medicine Hat
LaVar Payne

Peace River
Chris Warkentin, incumbent MP.

Red Deer
Earl Dreeshen

Vegreville—Wainwright
Leon Benoit, incumbent MP.

Westlock—St. Paul
Brian Storseth, incumbent MP.

Wetaskiwin
Blaine Calkins, incumbent MP.

Wild Rose
Blake Richards

Yellowhead
Rob Merrifield, incumbent MP.

British Columbia - 36 seats

Abbotsford
Ed Fast, incumbent MP since 2006.

British Columbia Southern Interior
Rob Zandee

Burnaby—Douglas
Ronald Leung

Burnaby—New Westminster
Sam Rakhra

Cariboo—Prince George
Dick Harris, incumbent MP.

Chilliwack—Fraser Canyon
Chuck Strahl, incumbent MP and Minister of Indian Affairs and Northern Development.

Delta—Richmond East
John Cummins, incumbent MP.

Esquimalt—Juan de Fuca
Troy DeSouza

Fleetwood—Port Kells
Nina Grewal, incumbent MP.

Kamloops—Thompson—Cariboo
Cathy McLeod

Kelowna—Lake Country
Ron Cannan, incumbent MP.

Kootenay—Columbia
Jim Abbott, incumbent MP.

Langley
Mark Warawa, incumbent MP since 2004 and Parliamentary Secretary to the Minister of the Environment.

Nanaimo—Alberni
James Lunney

Nanaimo—Cowichan
Reed Elley

Newton—North Delta
Sandeep Pandher

New Westminster—Coquitlam
Yonah Martin

North Vancouver
Andrew Saxton

Okanagan—Coquihalla
Stockwell Day, incumbent MP and Minister for Public Safety.

Okanagan—Shuswap
Colin Mayes, incumbent MP.

Pitt Meadows—Maple Ridge—Mission
Randy Kamp, incumbent MP.

Port Moody—Westwood—Port Coquitlam
James Moore, incumbent MP.

Prince George—Peace River
Jay Hill, incumbent MP.

Richmond
Alice Wong

Saanich—Gulf Islands
Gary Lunn, incumbent MP and Minister of Natural Resources.

Skeena—Bulkley Valley
Sharon Smith

South Surrey—White Rock—Cloverdale
Russ Hiebert, incumbent MP.

Surrey North
Dona Cadman

Vancouver Centre
Lorne Mayencourt

Vancouver East
Ryan Warawa

Vancouver Island North
John Duncan

Vancouver Kingsway
Salomon Rayek

Vancouver Quadra
Deborah Meredith

Vancouver South
Wai Young

Victoria
Jack McClintock

West Vancouver—Sunshine Coast—Sea to Sky Country
John Weston

Yukon - 1 seat

Yukon
Darrell Pasloski

Northwest Territories - 1 seat

Western Arctic
Brendan Bell

Nunavut - 1 seat

Nunavut
Leona Aglukkaq, MLA for Nattilik and Health Minister for the Government of Nunavut

See also
Results of the Canadian federal election, 2008
Results by riding for the Canadian federal election, 2008

References

 
Candidates in the 2008 Canadian federal election